Quick Heal Technologies, (known as Quick Heal) is an Indian multinational cybersecurity software company, headquartered in Pune, Maharashtra, India. The company was formerly known as CAT Computer Services (P) Ltd and was started as a computer service centre in 1995. The company was renamed as Quick Heal Technologies Pvt. Ltd. in 2007.

The company develops security software for consumers, servers, cloud computing environments and small and medium enterprises and sells products directly to customers or through its partner channel. Its enterprise product offerings operate under the brand name Seqrite. The companies products are regularly tested with features and abilities compared against other similar products. 

Quick Heal develops its own security suite and leverages a combination of signature-based and signatureless detection technologies to detect and block known and unknown threats in real-time.

History 
Quick Heal was founded in 1993, as "CAT Computer Services (P) Ltd" by Kailash Katkar and Sanjay Katkar and renamed in 2007. Quick Heal Technologies Ltd is listed on BSE and NSE.

Timeline
In 2010, Quick Heal received an investment of ₹60 Crores from Sequoia Capital And new branch offices were opened in Madurai, Tamil Nadu. In 2012, offices were opened in Japan and US, and in 2013, offices were opened in Africa and UAE.

In 2016, Quick Heal Technologies acquired an IT security firm Junco Technologies to launch Seqrite Services.

In 2016, Quick Heal Technologies launched its IPO which valued the company at a market value of ₹1,500 crores.

References

External links
 

Antivirus software
Computer security software companies
Windows security software
Companies based in Pune
Software companies established in 1993
Indian brands
Software companies of India
Indian companies established in 1993
1993 establishments in Maharashtra
Companies listed on the National Stock Exchange of India
Companies listed on the Bombay Stock Exchange